Omroep West is a Dutch regional broadcaster headquartered in The Hague. In 2012 the channel received 10 million Euro from the Dutch Government. It has 2 transmitters, Radio West founded in 1987 is broadcasting on 89.3 FM and TV West was founded in 1996. The two channels combined in 2002. Omroep West cooperates with Unity FM in Leiden and Stadsomroep Den Haag in The Hague.

TV West is the public TV-station for what happened in the South-Holland area with items as news, entertainment, politic, and local events like Leids Ontzet at 3 October in Leiden and KoninginneNach at 26 April in The Hague.

Radio West is the public radio for South-Holland and plays music from the 60's till the 00's. At daytime the talking program is about the news in the region in combination with music. At night they played Non-Stop the most relaxed classic from the 60's till the 00's.

External links

Radio in the Netherlands
Television in the Netherlands